A pastie  is a large to medium-sized battered deep-fried round of minced meat and vegetables common to Northern Ireland. Generally served with chips to form a "pastie supper" ("supper" in Northern Irish chip shops means something with chips), or in a white roll as a "pastie bap" or "pastie burger" it is a common staple in most fish and chip shops in the country.

Recipes vary, but the most common ingredients are minced pork, onion, potato and seasoning formed into a "round" (just like a burger), which is then covered in a batter mix and deep fried. Traditionally, chip shops coloured the pastie's filling with a cochineal dye, giving it a bright pink colour, supposedly to make the snack more appetising. Many shops have stopped using this method due to cochineal allergies.

See also
 Northern Irish cuisine
 List of Irish dishes
 Pastry
 Pasty

References

Cuisine of Northern Ireland
Deep fried foods
Pork dishes